Alijah Kotla also known as Kotla Alijah is a suburb in Hyderabad, India. It is located near the historic, Charminar and is existing from when the historic Charminar is established. It is one of the oldest area in Hyderabad located straight to the east of Charminar.

References

Neighbourhoods in Hyderabad, India